Cosimo Ulivelli (1625–1705) was an Italian painter of the Baroque period, active mainly in Florence. He was a pupil of the painter Baldassare Franceschini. He painted frescoes along the top of the wall of the nave of the church the Santissima Annunziata in Florence.

References

 Florencewalks

1625 births
1704 deaths
17th-century Italian painters
Italian male painters
18th-century Italian painters
Painters from Florence
Italian Baroque painters
18th-century Italian male artists